Warriors' Path State Park is a 950-acre (3.84 km²) Tennessee State Park in Colonial Heights, Kingsport, Sullivan County, Tennessee, in the United States.  It is named for the Great Indian Warpath that was used by the Iroquois in war raids with the Cherokee and other tribes. The park is located around the Fort Patrick Henry Reservoir and Duck Island on the South Fork Holston River. This land was acquired from the Tennessee Valley Authority in 1952.

Park activities and amenities

Trails

The park offers a variety of trails available for hiking, biking, and horseback riding. Hiking trails travel through forests and wetlands and range from paved, accessible paths to strenuous climbs. Horseback riding trails are available to both independent riders and those interested in guided walks. Stables offer a selection of riding horses and ponies as well as a place for owners to board their horses. Several historic settlements and houses can be seen along the trails.

Aquatics

A marina on Patrick Henry Reservoir offers boat slips as well as canoes and paddle boats for rent. Several public use ramps are available to visitors. Common fish in the lake include crappie, trout, catfish, bream, and bass. An Olympic-size swimming pool is open from Memorial Day to Labor Day.

Campgrounds

The main campground offers 90 campsites, each with tables, grills, water, and electrical hookups. A nearby overflow campground open from Memorial Day to Labor Day contains an additional 40 sites with tables and grills. Campgrounds include bathhouses and dumping stations.

Golf

The Warriors' Path Golf Course is an 18-hole par 72 course on the shores of the Patrick Henry Lake. The course was designed by George Cobb and opened in 1972. Facilities include a driving range, practice green, and practice bunker.

Other facilities

The park has many picnic tables and several pavilions that are available for rent. An accessible playground is open to children of all abilities. Tennis courts, soccer fields, and a 27-hole disc golf course are free to use.

References

External links
 Official Warriors' Path State Park website

State parks of Tennessee
Protected areas of Sullivan County, Tennessee
Braille trail sites
Protected areas established in 1952
1952 establishments in Tennessee